Clivina elongatula is a species of ground beetle in the subfamily Scaritinae. It was described by Nietner in 1856.

References

elongatula
Beetles described in 1856